Ab Lami (also Romanized as Āb Lamī-e Gūzenān; also known as Āb Lamī) is a village in Ludab Rural District, Ludab District, Boyer-Ahmad County, Kohgiluyeh and Boyer-Ahmad Province, Iran. At the 2006 census, its population was 188, in 34 families.

References 

Populated places in Boyer-Ahmad County